Malkh was a festival dedicated to the sun goddess Deela-Malkh in Vainakh mythology. 25 December was the birthday and the festival of the Sun. During the ceremonies suppliants turned to the east. Also in Nakh architecture temples and house façades were directed to the east. Nakh people believed that the Sun went to visit her mother, Aza at the summer and winter solstices. The journey took her six months to complete. Nakh people used the fylfot as symbol of Deela-Malkh on their buildings and tomb-stones.

See also
 Vainakh mythology

References

Nakh peoples
Nakh culture
Islamic festivals
December observances